The Halifax Hurricanes are a professional basketball team based in Halifax, Nova Scotia. The Hurricanes were founded as members of the National Basketball League of Canada (NBLC) to replace the Halifax Rainmen, who filed for bankruptcy in July 2015 ultimately leading to the club folding. In 2021, the organization left the NBLC.

History
Following steadily declining attendance and fallout from the 2015 NBL Canada Finals brawl the Halifax Rainmen folded in July 2015, with owner Andre Levingston citing bankruptcy with the franchise falling into a debt of nearly $700,000. The Rainmen's folding left a void in the Halifax professional basketball market and the league had lost one of its founding franchises and second largest market. Soon after, efforts began to replace the Rainmen.

On September 3, 2015, a new Halifax team was announced by the league. The new ownership group was expanded from just Andre Levingston to a 25-member investor group from the Halifax business community to stabilize ownership and reduce financial risk. Andre Levingston was named general manager of basketball operations. Hugo López was hired to be the franchise's first head coach on September 30, 2015. On October 20, 2015, the franchise unveiled its name and logo. The Hurricanes also announced their first two signings, former Rainmen player Cliff Clinkscales and newcomer Mike Glover.

In their first season, the Hurricanes won both preseason games before winning their first regular-season home game 129–113 against the Moncton Miracles in front of approximately 2,000 fans on December 26, 2015.

Coach López and the Hurricanes were unable to come to terms for a second season and Kevin Keathley was hired as head coach and general manager for the 2016–17 season. Unfortunately, coach Keathley had to leave the team before his first season for personal reasons. He was replaced by Mike Leslie. After three seasons, Leslie moved up to be the Hurricanes' president and general manager, with Ryan Marchand taking over as head coach.

The 2019–20 season was then curtailed in March 2020 due to the onset of the COVID-19 pandemic. The league subsequently cancelled its 2020–21 season due to continuing restrictions during the pandemic. In October 2021, the Hurricanes announced they had left the league.

Home arena

The Scotiabank Centre is a multi-purpose indoor sporting arena located in Halifax, Nova Scotia, Canada. The arena has a basketball capacity of 11,093. The Hurricanes share the arena with the Halifax Mooseheads of the Quebec Major Junior Hockey League, and The Halifax Thunderbirds of the National Lacrosse League. The building is next to the World Trade and Convention Centre in Downtown Halifax, at the foot of Citadel Hill and it is the largest arena in the maritimes by seating capacity.

Current roster

Season-by-season record

Notable players
To appear in this section a player must have either:
- Set a club record or won an individual award as a professional player.
- Played at least one official international match for his senior national team at any time.
 Coreontae DeBerry

See also
Sports teams in Halifax, Nova Scotia

References 
 How a Brawl and Sleazy Owner Killed the Halifax Rainmen, Vice Sports, 23 December 2015
 Investigan a Hugo López y Nguema por el caso de los Pasaportes, Marca, 4 February 2016
 La nacionalización fraudulenta de Slaughter y Panko apunta a dos ex del Real Madrid, Mundo Deportivo, 3 February 2016

External links

 
2015 establishments in Nova Scotia
Basketball teams established in 2015
Basketball teams in Nova Scotia
National Basketball League of Canada teams
Sport in Halifax, Nova Scotia